Marko Krasić (born 1 December 1985) is a Serbian professional footballer who plays for Canadian Soccer League club Serbian White Eagles.

Club career

Early career 
Krasić began his playing career with Borac Cacak. He would also play with Borac throughout their run in the country's top division.

He also played in the Serbian SuperLiga in 2009 with Metalac Gornji Milanovac. In total, he played in 26 matches and recorded 5 goals in the top tier. In 2011, he had a trial session with the Polish club Śląsk Wrocław.

Asia 
Krasić was recruited by the Indonesian side Arema to assist the club in the 2012 AFC Cup tournament. He helped the team reach the quarterfinals where they were defeated in a series of matches by Ettifaq FC. Throughout the continental tournament, he appeared in 7 matches.

After a season in the Indonesian top-tier, he remained in Asia to play in the Hong Kong First Division League with Citizen AA. He participated in the 2014 Lunar New Year Cup where he contributed a goal in the tournament final against S.C. Olhanense which secured the title for the club.

Various stints  
Following his run in Asia he returned to his native Serbia in 2014 to play in the Serbian First League with Inđija. In the summer of 2015, he played abroad in North America with the Serbian White Eagles in the Canadian Soccer League. In his debut season with Serbia, he assisted the club in securing the First Division title. SC Waterloo Region eliminated the Serbs in the second round of the playoffs. 

After his stint in Canada, he returned to Serbia to play in the country's third tier with Radnicki 1923 Kragujevac. He helped Radnicki secure promotion to the second division by winning the league title.

Return to Asia 
On 3 February 2016, he signed for Persib Bandung but ended up canceling his contract on 29 February 2016. His official return to the continent of Asia occurred in 2017 when he played in Hong Kong's premier league with Hong Kong Rangers. The next season he remained in the top tier by signing with Southern.

Balkans  
He returned to the Balkan region to play in the Montenegrin First League with Rudar Pljevlja. In 2020, he returned to the Serbian second division where he played with Sloga Kraljevo.

Canada 
Krasić returned to his former club the Serbian White Eagles for the 2022 season. He helped the Serbs in securing the regular-season title including a playoff berth. He played in the second round of the postseason against FC Continentals where the White Eagles were eliminated.

Managerial career 
In 2023, he served as a coach for the Serbian White Eagles academy program.

Personal life  
Krasić's older cousin Miloš Krasić was also a footballer.

Honours
Serbian White Eagles
 CSL Regular Season: 2015, 2022

Radnički Kragujevac
 Serbian League West: 2016–17

References

External links

 
 
 Citizen Football Club profile

1985 births
Living people
Sportspeople from Kragujevac
Serbian footballers
Serbian First League players
Serbian SuperLiga players
Expatriate footballers in Indonesia
Serbian expatriate sportspeople in Indonesia
Hong Kong Premier League players
Citizen AA players
Expatriate footballers in Hong Kong
Serbian expatriate sportspeople in Hong Kong
FK Borac Čačak players
FK Remont Čačak players
FK Metalac Gornji Milanovac players
FK Inđija players
Persib Bandung players
FK Radnički 1923 players 
FK Sloga Kraljevo players
Expatriate soccer players in Canada
Serbian expatriate sportspeople in Canada
Serbian White Eagles FC players
Serbian White Eagles FC non-playing staff
Hong Kong Rangers FC players
Southern District FC players
Canadian Soccer League (1998–present) players
Association football midfielders
Serbian League players
FK Rudar Pljevlja players
Montenegrin First League players